Vinod Kumar Shukla (born 1 January 1937) is a modern Hindi writer known for his style that often borders on magic-realism. His works include the novels Naukar ki Kameez (which has been made into the film of the same name by Mani Kaul) and Deewar Mein Ek Khirkee Rahati Thi (A Window lived in a Wall), which won the Sahitya Akademi Award for the best Hindi work in 1999. This novel has been made into a stage play by theatre director Mohan Maharishi.

Life and work 
He was born on 1 January 1937 in Rajnandgaon, Chhattisgarh (then Madhya Pradesh). His first collection of poems Lagbhag Jai Hind was published in 1971. Vah Aadmi Chala Gaya Naya Garam Coat Pehankar Vichar Ki Tarah was his second collection of poems, published in 1981 by Sambhavna Prakashan. Naukar Ki Kameez(The Servant's Shirt) was his first novel, brought out in 1979 by the same publisher. Per Par Kamra (Room on the Tree), a collection of short stories, was brought out in 1988, and another collection of poems in 1992, Sab Kuch Hona Bacha Rahega.

Vinod Kumar Shukla was a guest littérateur at the Nirala Srijanpeeth in AGRA from 1994 to 1996 during which he wrote two novels Khilega To Dekhenge and the refreshing Deewar Mein Ek Khirkee Rahati Thi. The latter has been translated into English by Prof. Satti Khanna of Duke University as  A Window Lived in a Wall(Publisher : Sahitya Akademi, New Delhi, 2005). He was presented an artists' residency by Ektara - Takshila's Centre for Children's Literature & Art where he produced a novel for Young Adults called "Ek Chuppi Jagah".

He did his M.Sc. in agriculture from Jawaharlal Nehru Krishi Vishwa Vidyalaya (JNKVV) in Jabalpur whereafter he joined as lecturer in Agriculture College Raipur. He was inspired considerably by the poet Muktibodh who was then a lecturer in Hindi at Digvijay College Rajnandgaon where Padumlal Punnalal Buxy was also working. Baldeo Prasad Mishra was also at Rajnandgaon at the same period.

Vinod Kumar Shukl's poems have been widely translated. In 2015, Delhi-based author Akhil Katyal translated Shukl's 'Hatasha se ek vyakti baith gaya' into English:

References

Poets from Chhattisgarh
Hindi-language writers
1937 births
Living people
People from Rajnandgaon
Recipients of the Sahitya Akademi Award in Hindi
Poets from Madhya Pradesh
20th-century Indian poets